(2Z,6E)-farnesyl-diphosphate diphosphate-lyase may refer to:

 (-)-gamma-cadinene synthase ((2Z,6E)-farnesyl diphosphate cyclizing), an enzyme
 Alpha-guaiene synthase, an enzyme
 5-epi-alpha-selinene synthase, an enzyme